The International Journal of Fatigue is a monthly peer-reviewed scientific journal covering research, theory, and practice concerning the fatigue of materials and structures. The journal is published by Elsevier in affiliation with the European Structural Integrity Society. As of October 2022, the editors-in-chief are Guozheng Kang (Southwest Jiaotong University), Michael D. Sangid (Purdue University), and Michael Vormwald (TU Darmstadt).

Abstracting and indexing
The journal is abstracted and indexed in:

According to the Journal Citation Reports, the journal has a 2021 impact factor of 5.489.

See also
Fracture mechanics
Solid mechanics

References

External links

Materials science journals
Elsevier academic journals
Monthly journals
English-language journals
Publications established in 1979